Zinterhofer is a surname. Notable people with the surname include:

Aerin Lauder Zinterhofer (born 1970), American billionaire heiress and businesswoman
Eric Zinterhofer (born 1971), American private equity financier, husband of Aerin